Andrew "Andy" Chandler is an American voice actor at Funimation who provided voices for English versions of Japanese anime series, and video games; most notably as Cooler from the Dragon Ball Z Movies. He studied with the Quad C Theatre Program at Collin County Community College in Plano, Texas. Chandler has been involved in radio since 2003 and currently is voice talent, writer and imaging producer for 100.3 Jack FM in Dallas, Texas as well as in charge of imaging for KRLD-AM, KRLD-FM, KVIL, KJKK-HD2, and KRLD-HD2. Chandler also does appearances for Jack throughout the DFW area, and is a music reporter for TXA21 television.

Filmography

Anime
 A Certain Magical Index - Acqua of the Back (Season 2)
 Baka and Test 2 - Takeshi Ooshima (Eps. 5, 7)
 BECK: Mongolian Chop Squad - Yamanaka (Ep. 26)
 Burst Angel - Mac (Ep. 4)
 Case Closed - Randall, Ned Armstrong, Tequila, Martin Hartwell, Georgie, Jericho
 The Devil Is a Part-Timer! - Nord Justina
 Dragon Ball series - Spopovich (Z), General Rilldo, Narrator (GT), others
 Eureka Seven: AO - Nick Tanaka
 Fairy Tail - Scorpio
 Fullmetal Alchemist - Bald (Ep. 5)
 Gunslinger Girl - Guglielmo (Ep. 7)
 High School DxD New - Lord Gremory
 Jormungand: Perfect Order - Edgar (Eps. 4, 9, 11–12)
 Kamisama Kiss - Jiro
 Kiddy Grade - Mad Bad Bull
 Level E - Iwata
 Maken-ki! - Kai Kuragasa
 One Piece - Absalom, Yama
 Shakugan no Shana - East Edge (Seasons 2–3)
 Shin-Chan - Yoshi
 Space Dandy - Minato (Ep. 16)
 Unbreakable Machine-Doll - Cherubim
 Yu Yu Hakusho - Byakko, Bakken

Films
 Dragon Ball Z: Cooler's Revenge - Cooler
 Dragon Ball Z: The Return of Cooler - Cooler
 Fafner in the Azure: Heaven and Earth - Ian Camp
 Fairy Tail: Dragon Cry - Scorpio
 Fullmetal Alchemist: The Sacred Star of Milos - Raul / Alan

Video games
 Borderlands 2 - Marauder Scattershot
 Dragon Ball Z: Budokai 3 - Cooler
 Dragon Ball Z: Budokai - HD Collection - Cooler (Budokai 3)
 Dragon Ball Z: Supersonic Warriors 2 - Cooler
 Dragon Ball Z: Budokai Tenkaichi - Cooler
 Dragon Ball Z: Budokai Tenkaichi 2 - Cooler
 Dragon Ball Z: Budokai Tenkaichi 3 - Cooler, Spopovich
 Dragon Ball Z: Shin Budokai - Another Road - Cooler
 Dragon Ball Z: Infinite World - Cooler
 Dragon Ball: Raging Blast 2  - Cooler
 Dragon Ball Z: Ultimate Tenkaichi - Cooler
 Dragon Ball Z: Battle of Z - Cooler
 Dragon Ball Xenoverse 2 - Cooler
 Dragon Ball FighterZ - Cooler
 Dragon Ball Z: Dokkan Battle - Cooler
 Dragon Ball Legends - Cooler, Rilldo
 Dragon Ball Z: Kakarot - Spopovich
 Fullmetal Alchemist and the Broken Angel - Mudey Nemda
 Fullmetal Alchemist 2: Curse of the Crimson Elixir - Bald
 The Gunstringer - Additional Voices
 One Piece: Unlimited Adventure - Paulie
 Spikeout: Battle Street - Additional voices
 Borderlands 3 - Elite Marauder

References

External links
 
 Resumé on Crystal Acids
 

Living people
American male voice actors
Year of birth missing (living people)